Hartwick College is a private liberal arts college in Oneonta, New York. The institution's origin is rooted in the founding of Hartwick Seminary in 1797 through the will of John Christopher Hartwick. In 1927, the Seminary moved to expand into a four-year college and was offered land by the city of Oneonta to move to its current location. The college has 1,200 undergraduate students from 30 states and 22 countries, 187 faculty members, and a student-faculty ratio of 11:1.

History

Hartwick College traces its history to the  will of Lutheran minister John Christopher Hartwick, who died in 1796. The following year the executors of his will decided to establish a seminary in his name. The first student graduated in 1803, and in 1816 the New York State Legislature incorporated the school—the first Lutheran seminary in America—as a classical academy and theological seminary in Hartwick, near Cooperstown. The school moved to its present location in Oneonta in 1928, when the Seminary's trustees voted to close it and incorporate there as a four-year college. The land for the campus was donated by the City of Oneonta. Bresee Hall, today the oldest building on campus, was designed by noted architect John Russell Pope and built in 1928. It was listed on the National Register of Historic Places in 2004.  The college's ties to the Lutheran Church ended in the 1960s, and it now carries no religious affiliation.

In May 2016, former President Margaret L. Drugovich was served a no confidence vote by the faculty and staff of Hartwick College and asked to resign. She was then awarded a new eight-year contract by the board of trustees to continue serving as president until 2024. In September 2021, Drugovich announced plans to retire in summer of 2022.  

In 2016, the college secured more than $34 million through its latest capital campaign, exceeding the original goal of $32 million.

On April 19, 2022, the college named Darren Reisberg as President Elect. He assumed office on August 1, 2022.

Academics
Hartwick College offers 31 majors and 24 areas of study leading to a Bachelor of Arts or Bachelor of Science degree. Additionally, it offers 11 minors, pre-professional programs in law, medicine, engineering and allied health professions; and five cooperative programs in engineering, law, business, and physical and occupational therapy. Students can also choose a concentration within their major.

The pre-engineering program at Hartwick has cooperative agreements with both Columbia University and Clarkson University that allow students to spend three years at Hartwick and two years at one of the other schools studying engineering. Successful completion brings a bachelor's degree from Hartwick and an engineering degree from Clarkson or 
Columbia.

Hartwick's three-year bachelor's degree program allows qualified students to receive a degree in three years, as opposed to the traditional four. Since its launch in 2009, the program has sparked national interest for cost savings and quality.

The Liberal Arts in Practice curriculum merges traditional liberal arts study, personalized teaching, and experiential learning. Hartwick encourages students to gain real-world experience through internships, volunteer work, and job shadowing. Hartwick assists in networking and job-shadowing programs in career locations such as Boston, New York City, and other local venues

Hartwick College is accredited by the Middle States Commission on Higher Education. The nursing program is accredited by the Commission on Collegiate Nursing Education and the American Chemical Society approves the Bachelor of Science degree program in chemistry.

Three-year bachelor’s degree program
Since 2009, Hartwick has offered a three-year bachelor's degree program, which allows students with an increased courseload to receive an undergraduate degree in liberal arts in three years instead of four. This reduces tuition by about 25%. No summer coursework is required (except for nursing majors), so three-year students can work, intern or travel during summer breaks. Most majors are included in the program, there is no required online component, and all courses are taught by Hartwick faculty.

January term
Every year, about 200-300 Hartwick students participate in 15-23 off-campus courses, taught by Hartwick faculty. Nearly every off-campus program is open to new students. All are open to majors and non-majors, with the exception of Trans-cultural Nursing in Jamaica. There are many scholarships available to support students who choose to study abroad during the college's January Term. Several international study-abroad scholarships are available: the Florence and George Hutman Scholarship, the Dobert Family Scholarship and the Andrew and Betty Anderson Scholarship.

Rankings

In 2021, U.S. News & World Report ranked Hartwick College 146th  out of 223 schools in its National Liberal Arts College Rankings.  In 2013, U.S. News & World Report also ranked Hartwick 21st among all U.S. colleges and universities for the percentage of students who study abroad.

Hartwick College is ranked 59th for liberal arts colleges on Payscale.com's 2016-17 list of highest-paid graduates.

Business Insider recognized Hartwick as #13 in their 2015 "50 Most Underrated Colleges in America" ranking for graduate earning potential. In 2013,  the college also placed #274 out of a list of 501 colleges and universities across the nation in its Complete Ranking Of America's 501 Smartest Colleges.

Forbes Magazine ranked Hartwick # 501 overall in the 2016 Forbes ranking of the best colleges and universities in the nation; public and private colleges and universities included.

In Washington Monthly’s 2019 College Rankings, Hartwick is ranked #130 out of 214 liberal arts colleges in the nation.

Student life
Hartwick offers student-run activities through more than 60 clubs and organizations that cover a wide variety of topics. The student governing body, Student Senate, oversees the constitutions and budgets of every club. There are a variety of honor societies and a variety of special-interest clubs ranging from academics to extracurricular activities. The Hartwick College Activities Board (HCAB) and SUNY Oneonta's student activities board host the downtown OH Fest street festival/concert each year for families and college students.

Greek Life at Hartwick College is based in a rich history dating back more than 80 years. During this time fraternities and sororities have been a valuable segment of the college experience. Fraternities include: Alpha Sigma Phi, Tau Kappa Epsilon, Phi Mu Alpha, and Kappa Sigma; sororities include: Alpha Omicron Pi, Theta Phi Alpha, local sorority Gamma Phi Delta, and local sorority Phi Sigma Phi.

Many Hartwick class events are organized by the Student Alumni Association (’Wick S.A.A.), including the OozeFest mud volleyball tournament, freshman sundae, sophomore barbecue, junior pig roast, and senior banquet. The campus newspaper is Hilltops, which is published weekly. Columns include Minds of the Roundtable, Athlete of the Week, The Comic Book Corner, and DSquared. Hartwick also operates a student-run radio station, WRHO 89.7 FM.

Pine Lake Environmental Campus
Hartwick College acquired the Pine Lake Environmental Campus in 1971. Pine Lake provides Hartwick students with opportunities for hands-on research, academic study, and responsible environmental stewardship and self-discovery. It offers a residential alternative to the main campus residence halls.

The campus has 11 buildings on over 300 preserved acres, including eight cabins that are used as student housing during the school year.

The Vaudevillian, an arched building, is used for movies, contra dances, indoor festivals and other events. Science courses that are taught at Pine Lake often use the R.R. Smith Field Station, which has a small classroom area, a computer lab area, and two lab rooms. A shuttle bus transports students to and from Pine Lake, and living at the environmental campus is an option for all full-time Hartwick students.

Many of Hartwick's activities are held at Pine Lake, including the Eco-Art Festival, Pine Lake Day, potluck dinners, Solstice parties, the Bread and Puppet Theater, contra dances, the Awakening freshmen pre-orientation program, the annual chili cook-off, the local food cook-off, photo contests and the Conversations at the Lake discussion series.

Boats and kayaks can be borrowed and used on the lake during warmer months. Pine Lake's facilities also are available to Hartwick staff, faculty, families and guests, as well as public members. There is an extensive trail system around the lake and on the northern side of the road, also called the Upper Tract. The Pine Lake Club installed a disc golf course with nine baskets between the lake and the back field near the Holton Memorial Trail.

Pine Lake sees more than 3,000 visitors a year and is open to the public through membership and summer rentals.

Athletics 

Hartwick's mascot is Swoop the Hawk. The school's colors are Wellesley Blue & White.

The college is a member of the National Collegiate Athletic Association (NCAA), competing at the Division III level, and is a member of the Empire 8 Conference.

The college discontinued D1 women's water polo in February 2018.

Hartwick's Men's soccer won the NCAA Division I National Title in 1977.

Men's sports
 College basketball
 Cross country running
 College football
 Indoor track and field
 College lacrosse
 Outdoor track and field
 College soccer
 Swimming and Diving

Women’s sports
 College basketball
 Cross country running
 Equestrian
 Field Hockey
 Indoor track and field
 College lacrosse
 Outdoor track and field
 College soccer
 Swimming and Diving
 Tennis
 Volleyball

Notable alumni
Scott Adams '79, creator of Dilbert
 Isaac Newton Arnold 1832, lawyer, politician, abolitionist. Attended Hartwick Seminary. 
Frederick H. Belden '32 (1909-1979), Tenth Episcopal Bishop of Rhode Island
John Bluem '74, former professional soccer player (Tampa Bay Rowdies), college coach (Fresno State and Ohio State) and broadcaster (Columbus Crew)
Jason Boltus '09, Quarterback for the Tampa Bay Storm of the Arena Football League
Mike Burns '93, former professional soccer player
Charles D. Cook '56 (1935–2001), former New York State senator
Peter Daempfle '92, author
Stephen L. Green '60 Chairman of SL Green Realty Corp, the largest landlord in NYC.
Tyler Hemming '07, professional soccer player (Toronto FC midfielder)
Harold E. Hyde '33, tenth President of Plymouth State University (NH) 
Matt Lawrence, professional soccer player
 David H. Long '83, CEO of Liberty Mutual Group 
Dave Lemanczyk, Major League baseball player 
Clarence MacGregor, former justice of the New York Supreme Court and United States representative (1919–1928)
Michael Maren '77, former journalist and current filmmaker.
Harold Clark Martin '37, 14th President of Union College (NY) 
Cyrus Mehri '83, noted Washington DC-based anti-discrimination lawyer 
Glenn "Mooch" Myernick '77, professional soccer player and coach
Craig Potter '07, professional Scottish footballer (soccer)
John A. Quitman, 10th and 16th Governor of Mississippi, and U.S. Representative from Mississippi; attended Hartwick Seminary.
Rory Read '83, COO of Dell
Andrew Sambrook '00, professional soccer player (Gillingham FC, Rushden & Diamonds, Grays Athletic)
James L. Seward '73, New York state senator
Craig Slaff '82, award-winning aviation artist
Nadya Zhexembayeva '01, co-founder and chief reinvention officer, WE EXIST Reinvention Agency
 Maxwell Jacob Friedman Professional Wrestler

References

External links 
 

 
Private universities and colleges in New York (state)
Liberal arts colleges in New York (state)
Educational institutions established in 1797
1797 establishments in New York (state)
Universities and colleges in Otsego County, New York
Glassmaking schools